The Jacob Burns Film Center (JBFC) is a nonprofit cultural arts center located in Pleasantville, New York. It occupies the old Rome Theater, a Spanish mission-style theater built in 1925.

Along with independent and documentary films, the center hosts a variety of special events, including discussions with filmmakers, critics and people from the industry following some screenings. The New York Times has credited the theater with helping to revitalize the downtown area of Pleasantville

History
The Rome Theater, named after its owner Granville Rome, was originally built in 1925 and was the first movie theater in Westchester County. The theater matched the movie palace designs that were popular at the time, including leather seats, friezes, velvet curtains and an original Photolayer pipe organ. The Rome Theater continued screening movies until it closed in 1987 and became an office building.

In 1998 Stephen Apkon and the non-profit Friends of the Rome Theater purchased the  Rome Theater and a  land parcel next door for $1 million. Over the next 3 years, another $4 million was spent for design and construction. The center opened its doors in June 2001 and covered  including three theaters containing 249 seats, 135 and 72 seats. The theater was named in honor of Jacob Burns, a lawyer whose family foundation gave $1.5 million towards the renovation efforts.

In 2008, the JBFC opened a $15 million Media Arts Lab and started new programs targeting digital literacy in the surrounding area. The opening of the 2008 center was part of the JBFC's larger digital literacy education efforts that included sending some staff down to prisons in Venezuela to teach prisoners and teachers there about digital literacy.

Films
The Jacob Burns Film Center shows independent and documentary films. It rarely shows mainstream films, except for special showings, as when, for example, they had a showing of A Series of Unfortunate Events with Daniel Handler and Meryl Streep in attendance.

References

External links
 

Cinemas and movie theaters in New York (state)
Mount Pleasant, New York